Estradiol stearate (E2-17-St), also known as estradiol octadecanoate and sold under the brand name Depofollan, is a naturally occurring estrogen and an estrogen ester – specifically, the C17β stearate ester of estradiol. It occurs in the body as a very long-lasting metabolite and prohormone of estradiol. The compound is one of the components that collectively constitute lipoidal estradiol, another of which is estradiol palmitate. It is extremely lipophilic and hydrophobic. Estradiol stearate has no affinity for the estrogen receptor, requiring transformation into estradiol via esterases for its estrogenic activity. The compound does not bind to sex hormone-binding globulin or α-fetoprotein, instead being transported by lipoproteins such as high-density lipoprotein and low-density lipoprotein.

Estradiol stearate has a prolonged duration of action relative to estradiol regardless of whether it is given by intravenous injection or subcutaneous injection. This is in contrast to short-chain fatty acid esters of estradiol, such as estradiol benzoate, which do not show a prolonged duration with intravenous injection. When administered by intravenous injection in rodents, estradiol stearate has a greatly increased terminal half-life relative to estradiol (6 hours vs. 2 minutes). Estradiol stearate also had a half-life that was 60% longer than that of estradiol arachidonate, despite similar ester chain lengths. In contrast to the long-chain esters, the half-lives of short-chain estradiol esters such as estradiol acetate and estradiol hexanoate were the same as that of estradiol. As such, whereas short-chain estradiol esters are rapidly hydrolyzed, long-chain estradiol esters like estradiol stearate are resistant to metabolism. Thus, the prolongation of effect of short-chain estradiol esters is purely due to their increased lipophilicity and slow release from the injected depot, whereas the prolonged duration of long-chain estradiol esters is due both to this property and to their resistance to metabolism. Estradiol stearate is susceptible to first-pass metabolism in the liver, and hence has much greater potency by subcutaneous injection than by oral administration.

In addition to its endogenous role, estradiol stearate was previously available as a pharmaceutical drug for use via depot intramuscular injection. The medication was introduced between 1938 and 1941 under the brand name Depofollan. It has been used to treat prostate cancer. Estradiol stearate is a long-acting estrogen and is said to have been the first long-acting estrogen used in medicine, although it was never widely employed. It was reported to have a duration of more than one month. The medication was provided as an oil solution in ampoules containing 15 mg estradiol stearate. It was manufactured by Chinoin, a Hungarian pharmaceutical company. The compound was studied by Karl Miescher in 1938 and was patented by Miescher and Chinoin in 1939 and 1941, respectively. A similar clinically used long-acting estradiol ester is estradiol undecylate, which has 11 carbon atoms instead of the 18 carbon atoms in estradiol stearate.

See also
 List of estrogen esters § Estradiol esters

References

Abandoned drugs
Estradiol esters
Prodrugs
Stearate esters